The Party of Communists of Kyrgyzstan is a communist party in Kyrgyzstan, founded on 22 June 1992. It publishes the daily newspaper Pravda Kyrgyzstana. The party considers itself to be the successor of the Communist Party of Kirghizia, which ruled Kyrgyzstan during the Soviet era.

It was the largest political party in the Legislative Assembly of Kyrgyzstan between 2001 and 2005, with 15 of the 60 seats. In the 2005 parliamentary election it won 1 of the 75 seats. Two years later, the party took eight seats in the larger 90-seat Supreme Council. However, the party failed to win any seats in successive legislative elections held in 2010 and 2015. In the 2020 parliamentary election, party leader Iskhak Masaliyev ran on the United Kyrgyzstan list.

The party was formerly led by Absamat Masaliyev, a former leader of the Kirghiz SSR during the Soviet era, until his death in 2004. The party's current chairman is Bumairam Mamaseitova.

Notes

References

External links 
 Official website (archive)

Political parties in Kyrgyzstan
Communist parties in Kyrgyzstan
Kyrgyzstan
International Meeting of Communist and Workers Parties
Neo-Sovietism